Marcus Denis Flather  (born December 1957) is an American academic who is a clinical professor in medicine at Norwich Medical School. A specialist in cardiology, he is also a recognised expert in clinical trials.

Education 
Flather was educated at Rugby School. He graduated from the UCL Medical School in 1982 and trained in general medicine and cardiology in London and Oxford. He completed an MBA at the University of East Anglia in 2016.

Career 
Flather is a former director of the Clinical Trials and Evaluation Unit (CTEU) at the Royal Brompton and Harefield Hospitals. He has an h-index of 102 according to Google Scholar.

References

1957 births
Living people
People educated at Rugby School
Alumni of University College London
Alumni of the University of East Anglia
Academics of the University of East Anglia
Fellows of the Royal College of Physicians
Academic staff of McMaster University